The John Dewey Society was founded in 1935, and was the first organization focused on philosophy of education. Its goal is to "keep alive John Dewey's commitment to the use of critical and reflective intelligence in the search for solutions to crucial problems in education and culture." The Society conducts a variety of activities, produces a peer-reviewed journal, and hosts the annual John Dewey Lecture at the American Educational Research Association conference, and offers the John Dewey Memorial Lecture at the annual Association for Supervision and Curriculum Development conference.

Works about the JDS 
 Axtelle, G.E. (2007) "H. Gordon Hullfish and the John Dewey Society," Educational Theory. 13;3, pp 220 – 221.
 Harap, H. (1970) "The Beginnings of the John Dewey Society," Educational Theory. 20;2, pp 157–63.

See also 
 Center for Dewey Studies
 Democratic education
 Democratic school
 Progressive education

References

External links 
 John Dewey Society official website.
 John Dewey Society Records, 1934-1987 at Southern Illinois University Carbondale, Special Collections Research Center

Philosophical societies in the United States
Organizations established in 1935
John Dewey